Vietnam competed at the 2016 Summer Paralympics in Rio de Janeiro, Brazil, from 7 September to 18 September 2016.

Support 
In September 2015,  Deputy Director of the General Department of Sports and Physical Training, Pham Van Tuan attended the Rio 2016 Paralympic Games Chef de Mission seminar as part of the country's preparation efforts for the 2016 Games.  He talked to representatives from Japan, South Korea, Russia and the Asian Paralympic Committee about increasing cooperation with them.

In February 2015, 12 athletes attended a training event at the National Sports Training Centre in Ho Chi Minh City as part of Paralympic readiness training.

Medallists

Athletics

Athletics is one of three sports which Vietnam plans to send athletes to compete in at the Rio Games.   Athletes identified as potential Rio qualifiers included Cao Ngoc Hung, Nguyen Be Hau, Nguyen Ngoc Hiep and Nguyen Thi Nhan. Vietnamese track and field competitors participated in the 2015 World Championships in Doha, Qatar as part of their readiness for Rio campaign.

Field Events - Men

Field Events - Women

Powerlifting 

Powerlifting is one of three sports which Vietnam plans to send athletes to compete in at the Rio Games. Lifters identified as potential Rio qualifiers included Le Van Cong, Nguyen Binh An, Dang Thi Linh Phuong and Chau Hoang Tuyet Loan. 

Le Van Cong and Nguyen Binh An are powerlifters from Vietnam.  They competed at the 2015 ASEAN Para Games as part of their 2016 Paralympic Games preparation. Cong won gold in the 49kg event and An won gold in the 54kg event.  Tung, Cong and An hang their hopes of going to Rio on 2016 European Open Swimming Championships, where they will need to qualify. 

Vietnamese powerlifters participated in the 2015 Asian Championships in July.  The event was held in Almaty, Kazakhstan, and was part of their qualifying efforts.

Women

Men

Swimming 

Swimming is one of three sports which Vietnam plans to send athletes to compete in at the Rio Games.  Vietnamese swimmers participated in the World Championships as part of their efforts to prepare for the Games.   Swimmers identified as potential Rio qualifiers included Trinh Thi Bich Nhu, Vo Thanh Tung, Nguyen Thanh Trung and Do Thanh Hai.  The swimmers are coached by Dong Quoc Cuong.

For only the second time in the country's history, they participated in the 2015 IPC Swimming World Championships.  The country sent five swimmers who were trying to qualify for Rio.  The team had been based at the HCM City for most of the year in preparation for qualifying.  Can Tho-born Tung competed in five events at the world championships.  The swimmer from Can Tho Province went into the event with five gold medals that he won at the 2014 Asian Para Games and having represented Vietnam at the 2012 Summer Paralympics.  Do Thanh Hai competed in the  men's 100m backstroke and 100m breast stroke-SB4.  Trinh Thi Bich Nhu secured her Rio qualification at the 2015 World Championships in the SB5 100m breaststroke event with a time of 1:57.43.  Her silver medal in the event was the first won by a para-swimmer from Vietnam, male or female, at an international swimming event.  She competed at the world championships in two events, women's 100m butterfly and 50m freestyle-SP5.

Men

Women

See also
Vietnam at the 2016 Summer Olympics

References

Nations at the 2016 Summer Paralympics
2016
2016 in Vietnamese sport